The Double Tenth Agreement, formally known as the Summary of Conversations Between the Government and Representatives of the Communist Party of China, was an agreement between the Kuomintang (KMT) and the Chinese Communist Party (CCP) that was concluded on 10 October 1945 (the Double Ten Day of the Republic of China) after 43 days of negotiations. CCP Chairman Mao Zedong and United States Ambassador to China Patrick J. Hurley flew together to Chongqing on 27 August 1945 to begin the negotiations. The outcome was that the CCP acknowledged the KMT as the legitimate government, while the KMT in return recognised the CCP as a legitimate opposition party. The Shangdang Campaign, which began on 10 September, came to an end on 12 October as a result of the announcement of the agreement.

The agreement was signed at what is now the Red Rock Village Museum in Chongqing.

China in 1945 
At the time of the Double Tenth Agreement, China had just concluded the Second Sino-Japanese War, an eight-year war that resulted in a Chinese coalition victory. Poor relations between the KMT and CCP during the war was soon exacerbated due to the loss of a shared goal both parties held; the defeat of the Japanese troops in China.

The CCP quickly denounced the KMT as a reactionary clique and had plans for the removal of KMT hegemony in China, which included Soviet support. However, a strengthening of Soviet relations with the KMT after the war with the Sino-Soviet Treaty of Friendship and Alliance, signed on 14 August 1945, resulted in a reversal of Soviet foreign policy in China. A part of the treaty was the Soviet Union recognising the Nationalists (KMT) as the legitimate government of China. This and Soviet pressure on the CCP to begin negotiation with the KMT and Soviet wishes to foster positive relations and maintain peace between the two political parties led to the CCP accepting the invitations from the KMT for talks.

Events 
Chiang Kai-shek, the leader of the KMT party, had been sending invitations for the CCP to join Chiang in Chongqing to initiate conversations between the two major parties after the Japanese surrender on 14 August 1945. Mao Zedong, after being pressured by the Soviets, finally accepted and arrived in Chongqing with the U.S. Ambassador Patrick J. Hurley and Zhang Zhizhong in late August.

The talks ran over a course of 41 days starting from 28 August 1945 and concluded with the signing of the Double Tenth Agreement on 10 October 1945. During the negotiations, CCP military operations were increased with Mao ordering the CCP troops in Shandong and Central China to attack 40-50 thousand KMT troops in each region. This string of battles between the CCP and KMT, known as the Shangdang Campaign, began on 10 September and concluded on 12 October. This was done to put Mao and the CCP in a greater position of power during the talks and also to emphasise the goals that Mao had in mind for the negotiations. The battles resulted in a victory for Mao and the CCP which skewed the negotiations to Mao's favour.

The CCP did initially make some concessions to the KMT during the talks, however none of them came to fruition. Some examples of the concessions initially made was a reduction of the CCP military to 20 divisions and the withdrawal of troops from a few southern CCP-occupied provinces. The reduction of the CCP military to 20 divisions was not an issue for Mao however, as to maintain the current military, Mao planned to increase the size of each division, resulting in no actual reduction of the military.

By the end of the negotiations, the two parties managed to reach agreements on a few policies. The primary policies being the CCP recognising the legitimacy of the  KMT governance over China, the democratisation of the political parties, the formation of a national assembly and the nationalisation of troops.

Reasons for negotiating

Kuomintang (KMT) 
Each party had different purposes for negotiating with the opposing side. The KMT, led by Chiang, wished for the unification of the military and government administration underneath the KMT with the CCP as an opposition party. Chiang also wanted the CCP to "refrain from independent actions" and to assume control over the CCP controlled regions in northern China. However, Chiang initially did not want to negotiate with the CCP and wished to defeat the CCP before they became a larger threat. It was only due to US pressure for peace talks between the two parties that the KMT decided to begin negotiation with the CCP.

Chiang primarily wished for both political and military unity underneath the KMT, however this would never be accepted by the CCP so he changed his goals a little to unity initially underneath the KMT, with the transition of China into a democratic government allowing the CCP to gain power.

Chinese Communist Party (CCP) 
Mao's intentions for the negotiations was much less based around peace between the two sides, and instead to assist in preparation for a future revolution. Mao placed great importance on the division of land between the KMT and CCP, desiring a north–south split in the Chinese region between the two parties. Mao also knew that the KMT would not be in the position to start a civil war and so used the negotiations as a way to "mobilize the masses, to win over the puppet troops, to publish newspapers [and] to develop our secret service". The CCP initially was not interested in negotiating with the KMT at all, but several secret telegrams from Stalin to Mao urging him to accept Chiang's calls for talks resulted in the acceptance of Chiang's invitation for negotiations in Chongqing.

The CCP also placed great importance on the occupation of Manchuria. They saw the future control of Manchuria as a "guarantee that peace in the Far East will be preserved". The CCP also believed that the revolution would be impacted by the capture or loss of Manchuria, with each outcome either speeding up or postponing the revolution by a few years.

Results

Conditions of the treaty 
On 10 October 1945, the Double Tenth Agreement was signed by the KMT and CCP in Chongqing. The conditions agreed upon by the KMT and CPP are as follows:

 The CCP would recognise the KMT as the legitimate ruling party of China.
 The legalisation and ensured equality of all political parties within China
 KMT and CCP acceptance of a joint peaceful state building of China, making efforts to prevent civil war at the same time
 The formation of a political conference to discuss plans for state building with guaranteed representation of all political parties
 The abolition of CCP and KMT secret services
 Holding a general election to determine the next ruling party of China
 Putting an end to political tutelage within China, a phase that ensured one-party rule under the KMT, giving them the rights to govern China autocratically

Failure of the Double Tenth Agreement 
After the signing of the treaty, relations quickly declined between the KMT and CCP. In private conversations with Mao, it is evident that he did not see the talks as a way for peace between the CCP and KMT. Mao states "Our policy was set long ago – to give tit for tat, to fight for every inch of land". Mao was unwilling to abandon his revolutionary goals which implied to the KMT that the CCP would not lay down their arms and become a party opposition in a democratic coalition.

There is also evidence of Chiang not viewing the talks earnestly. Chiang used the talks as a way to reduce international pressure on the KMT party as well as a stalling tactic to help assist his primary goal of eliminating the CCP. A secret telegram sent on 29 September by Chiang to various commanders-in-chief stated "The purpose of the current negotiation with the Communist Party is to find out its demands and purposes and to reduce international pressure on us". Later onwards in the telegram Chiang orders his commanders to occupy the major cities in the previously occupied Japanese zones. The military advantage gained over the CCP through doing this would then be used to make the CCP submit to the KMT. If the CCP refused to submit to the military rule of the KMT, then they would be eliminated "as bandits".

The treaty between the CCP and KMT ultimately failed. Neither side wished to compromise with each other as it would result in a future where their respective party could not gain complete control over China. The KMT would not agree to a treaty in which they would have to give up many of their advantages held over the CCP and the CCP did not desire to be in a position within the new government in which they could not gain complete power. As well as years of poor relations between the two parties, and a general mistrust of each side, the Double Tenth Agreement resulted in failure and by 1946, civil war had erupted between the CCP and KMT.

International intervention

United States 

During the talks between the KMT and CCP, United States Ambassador to China Patrick J. Hurley, traveled to Chongqing to assist with the negotiations and to ensure that US policy and goals were realised in China. Hurley arrived in Chongqing in mid-August with Mao Zedong and Zhang Zhizong. The US objective was to maintain peace between the KMT and CCP, and stability in the Chinese region, while remaining out of China's internal affairs. The US government believed that China would not be effective in a possible war against the USSR, due to assumptions that such a war would be primarily air-based. Therefore, the US saw no use in sending military support to the KMT if a civil war were to erupt. The US believed that, if a civil war was to occur, without US military intervention, it would be likely that the CCP would win. Therefore, to ensure the survival of the KMT, the US supported the idea of a joint coalition government of the KMT and CCP. This was believed to be the most effective method of preventing complete CCP control over China without major US military intervention.

Throughout the negotiations, Hurley was optimistic about the talks, even near the end, stating, "the rapprochement between the two leading parties of China seems to be progressing and the discussion and rumors of civil war recede as the conference continues." This was primarily due to his deep investment in the talks and desire for the talks to have gone smoothly.

Hurley resigned from his position on 27 November due to his belief that the United States were secretly favouring the CCP. With Hurley's resignation, the US sent General George Marshall to continue mediation in China.

Soviet Union  
As well as the US, the Soviets also sent an ambassador to assist with the negotiations and to ensure that Soviet policy and goals in the region were met. The USSR ambassador  was sent to Chongqing in August. The Soviets had similar aims to the United States, wishing to prevent war between the two parties, but had different motives: the Soviets wished for peace between the two parties because they believed that a civil war would impede the reconstruction of China, not because they were concerned with which side would prevail in the event of a civil war.

Due to ideological similarities, the Soviets did favour the CCP, however during the Double Tenth Agreement did not outwardly support the party. The Soviet invasion of Manchuria at the end of World War II resulted in Soviet occupation of the region, which continued during the talks. The CCP did show a desire to obtain the land. The Soviets assisted CCP skirmishes within Manchuria by turning over seized Japanese armaments to the CCP and by preventing KMT access to Manchuria.

Unlike Hurley, the Soviets mainly saw the talks as a disappointment, with Stalin even stating that the Soviet government was not happy with the Chinese Communists' behaviour and that the KMT government should have made more concessions towards the CCP.

References

Bibliography
 Radchenko, Sergey. Lost Chance For Peace: The 1945 CCP-Kuomintang Peace Talks Revisited. Journal Of Cold War Studies, vol 19, no. 2, 2017, pp. 84–114.
 Britannica, The Editors of Encyclopaedia. Chinese Civil War. Encyclopædia Britannica, 18 February 2020
 Yin, Ching-yao. The Bitter Struggle Between The KMT And The CCP". Asian Survey, vol 21, no. 6, 1981, pp. 622–631.
 Lin, Li. Road To The Second KMT-CCP Civil War. End Of Empire, 2015
 Taylor, George E. "The Hegemony of the Chinese Communists, 1945–1950. The Annals of the American Academy of Political and Social Science, vol 277, no. 1, 1951, pp. 13–21.
 The Chinese Revolution of 1949. Milestones: 1945–1952 – Office Of The Historian. History.State.Gov, 2021.
 Hainian, Liu. The Struggle for Human Rights by the Communist Party of China. Chinese Academy of Social Sciences, 2011.
 Kucha, Glenn, Llewellyn, Jennifer. The Nanjing Decade. Alpha History, 2019
 Why and How the CPC Works in China. China.org.cn. 2011

1945 in China
Treaties concluded in 1945
Treaties entered into force in 1945
Treaties of the Republic of China (1912–1949)
History of the Chinese Communist Party
People's Republic of China
Kuomintang
Chinese Communist Party
Mao Zedong
Chiang Kai-shek